Verticordia endlicheriana var. angustifolia is a flowering plant in the myrtle family, Myrtaceae and is endemic to the south-west of Western Australia. It is a small, upright shrub with narrow leaves and sweetly-perfumed, golden-yellow flowers which do not change colour as they age.

Description

Flowering occurs from August to November.

Taxonomy and naming
Verticordia endlicheriana was first formally described by Johannes Conrad Schauer in 1844 and the description was published in Lehmann's Plantae Preissianae. In 1991, Alex George undertook a review of the genus Verticordia and described five varieties of Verticordia endlicheriana including this variety. The epithet "angustifolia" is from the Latin word meaning "narrow-leaved" referring to the leaves near the flowers, compared to those of the other varieties of this species.

Distribution and habitat
This variety grows in rocky crevices between granite boulders in heath near Mount Barker, Mount Roe and Mount Lindesay in the Jarrah Forest biogeographic region.

Conservation
Verticordia endlicheriana var. angustifolia is classified as "Priority Three" by the Western Australian Government Department of Parks and Wildlife meaning that it is poorly known and known from only a few locations but is not under imminent threat.

Use in horticulture
The pine-like foliage and brightly coloured perfumed flowers of this variety have encouraged attempts to cultivate it and some specimens have grown in gardens for up to 4 years. It is usually propagated from cuttings although these are sometimes slow to develop into established plants. Those in sand or sandy gravel do the best but suffer in extreme heat.

References

endlicheriana
Rosids of Western Australia
Eudicots of Western Australia
Plants described in 1991